Greg Krause (born April 4, 1976 in Boston, Massachusetts) was an Arena Football League offensive lineman for the Los Angeles Avengers.

References

1976 births
American football offensive linemen
Los Angeles Avengers players
Sportspeople from Manchester, New Hampshire
Living people